Pectis cylindrica, the Sonoran cinchweed, is an annual plant and species of Pectis. Pectis cylindrica is native to the southwestern United States (Arizona, New Mexico and Texas) and in northwestern Mexico (Baja California Sur, Chihuahua, Coahuila, Durango, Nuevo León, Sinaloa, Sonora).

Pectis cylindrica is similar to Pectis prostrata and the two occasionally grow together. Some herbaria contain mixed collections of the two although no evidence is available of hybrids between them.

References

cylindrica
Flora of Arizona
Flora of Texas
Flora of New Mexico
Flora of Chihuahua (state)
Flora of Baja California Sur
Flora of Coahuila
Flora of Durango
Flora of Nuevo León
Flora of Sinaloa
Flora of Sonora